Ghighiu may refer to the following places in Romania:

 Ghighiu (Sărata), a tributary of the Sărata in Prahova and Ialomița Counties
 Ghighiu (Teleajen), a tributary of the Teleajen in Prahova County
 Ghighiu, a village in the commune Bărcănești, Prahova County